Biba is a city in Beni Suef Governorate, Egypt. It contains a cathedral that dates back to the sixth century.

The city was called Papa or Papa Megale in Ptolemaic and Byzantine Egypt.

See also 

 List of cities and towns in Egypt

References

Populated places in Beni Suef Governorate